Granit Xhaka (born 27 September 1992) is a Swiss professional footballer who plays as a midfielder for  club Arsenal and the Switzerland national team.

Xhaka began his career at hometown club FC Basel, winning the Swiss Super League in each of his first two seasons. He then moved to Bundesliga team Borussia Mönchengladbach in 2012, developing a reputation as a technically gifted player and natural leader alongside criticism for his temperament. He was made captain of Borussia Mönchengladbach in 2015 at the age of 22, leading the team to UEFA Champions' League qualification for a second successive season. He completed a high-profile transfer to Arsenal in May 2016 for a fee in the region of £30 million. He later became vice captain of the club.

Xhaka was part of the Swiss team that won the 2009 FIFA U-17 World Cup. He made his senior debut in 2011 and has won over 110 caps, representing the nation at the FIFA World Cup in 2014, 2018 and 2022 and the UEFA European Championship in 2016 and 2020.

Early life
Granit Xhaka was born on 27 September 1992 in the city of Basel, Switzerland, into an ethnic Albanian family from Podujevo, Kosovo, then part of the FR Yugoslavia. The family moved from Podujevo to Basel, Switzerland that year where Granit and his older brother Taulant Xhaka were born.

Club career

FC Basel
Xhaka started his youth football with Concordia Basel and moved to FC Basel in 2002. He played for various Basel youth teams and in 2008 became a member of the U-21 squad. Between 2008 and 2010, he played 37 games for the U-21 team, scoring 11 goals. Former Basel coach Thorsten Fink once said that "Xherdan Shaqiri is the best talent in Switzerland...after Granit Xhaka." The Swiss national football coach, Ottmar Hitzfeld, dubbed him the 'young Schweinsteiger.'

Since the beginning of the 2010–11 season, Xhaka played for the Basel first team. He made his first team debut in the third qualifying round of the 2010–11 UEFA Champions League in the away match against Debrecen in the Szusza Ferenc Stadium. Towards the end of the match, he scored the second goal in Basel's 2–0 victory. He scored his first Super League goal in the 5–1 home win against FC Thun on 15 May 2011. At the end of the 2010–11 season, Xhaka won the Super League Championship title with Basel and at the end of the 2011–12 season he won the Double, the League Championship title and the Swiss Cup with the club.

Borussia Mönchengladbach

On 18 May 2012, Basel announced on their homepage that Xhaka had agreed terms with Lucien Favre's Borussia Mönchengladbach. After medical checks were completed, Xhaka signed a five-year deal with the club. The transfer fee was not disclosed by Mönchengladbach, but is estimated to be in the region of €8.5 million.

Xhaka made his debut in a DFB-Pokal first round match against Alemannia Aachen on 18 August 2012. Three days later, he made his first appearance in European competition for Borussia in 1–3 home lost to Dynamo Kyiv in qualification for the 2012–13 UEFA Champions League. On 25 August, he made his Bundesliga debut in the team's opening match of the season, a 2–1 home win against 1899 Hoffenheim. He scored his first and only goal of the season in a 3–2 loss at 1. FC Nürnberg.

In his second season at the club, Xhaka started 29 times and made five substitute appearances as Gladbach finished in sixth place in the 2014–15 Bundesliga. In 2014–15, Xhaka started all 34 2014–15 Bundesliga matches for Borussia and was named in the league's team of the season. Borussia finished in third place to qualify for the 2015–16 UEFA Champions League.

On 23 September 2015, Xhaka captained Borussia and scored his first goal of the season, heading in from Raffael's free kick in a 4–2 win over FC Augsburg. In the next match, against VfB Stuttgart, Xhaka again captained the side and scored a goal in a 3–1 win. On 30 September, he made his first appearance for Borussia in the Champions League proper in a 1–2 group stage loss at home to Manchester City. Xhaka received his fifth red card for the team in his 95th game on 20 December, for striking his opponent in the first half; he voluntarily gave €20,000 to charity as an apology.

Arsenal

On 25 May 2016, Arsenal signed Xhaka from Borussia Mönchengladbach for a fee of around £30–35 million. Xhaka was signed after Arsenal allegedly backed out of N'Golo Kanté transfer due to agent fees involved which totalled more than £10 million. Xhaka made his first appearance for Arsenal (as a half-time substitution) in a 2–1 win against the MLS All-Stars.

Xhaka made his competitive debut for Arsenal in the club's opening match of the 2016–17 Premier League season, a 4–3 defeat to Liverpool, replacing midfielder Mohamed Elneny in the 65th minute while also picking up a yellow card in the process. His first goal for the club came on 17 September 2016, a 25-yard thunderbolt in a 4–1 Premier League victory against Hull City. Four days later, he would score again from distance, this time from 30 yards in a 4–0 EFL Cup defeat of Nottingham Forest. Xhaka's first Arsenal red card – and eighth for club and country since April 2014 – came in a 3–2 win over Swansea City on 15 October 2016. On 22 January 2017, Xhaka was sent off for the second time in the season, by referee Jon Moss, in Arsenal's 2–1 home win against Burnley. After his first goal for the club in September, he would not score in the Premier League again until doing so in May, scoring the first goal of a 2–0 victory over Manchester United, ending United's run of 25 consecutive games unbeaten.

Xhaka went on to feature throughout Arsenal's triumphant FA Cup campaign. As so he started in the Cup final against Chelsea which the Gunners won 2–1. Xhaka also played in the 2017 Community Shield that Arsenal won on penalties over Chelsea.
His first goal of the 2017–18 season came in a 3–3 draw with Liverpool, Xhaka scored a 25-yard thunderbolt to take Arsenal from 2–1 to 2–2.

On 15 September 2018, Xhaka scored the first goal, from a direct free kick, in a 2–1 victory against Newcastle United. On 28 October 2018, he scored again from a free kick against Crystal Palace. On 27 September 2019, Arsenal manager Unai Emery confirmed that Xhaka will be the new captain for the Gunners, replacing Laurent Koscielny.

In the match against Crystal Palace at Emirates Stadium on 27 October 2019, Xhaka was at the center of criticism after being substituted off in the 61st minute. The incident began when a portion of Arsenal fans started to cheer when his name was called to be replaced. He was booed as he walked off the pitch, and responded by making several sarcastic gestures and angrily saying "fuck off" twice to the fans who jeered his name. He also removed his jersey before walking straight down the tunnel. Xhaka's actions were met with significant criticism after the match, and manager Unai Emery described Xhaka's conduct as "wrong". Emery also suggested that Xhaka should apologise. On 30 October 2019 the club announced that Xhaka would be offered counselling. Arsenal later tweeted an explanation from Xhaka about the incident.
On 5 November 2019, just a month and a week after his announcement as captain, Xhaka was stripped of the captain's armband. Pierre-Emerick Aubameyang took over as the captain after previously serving as vice captain.

After this incident, Xhaka began a hiatus from the first team squad and it was deemed highly likely that Xhaka would leave Arsenal in the upcoming January transfer window. However, under the tenure of new manager Mikel Arteta, Xhaka was reintroduced into the team as a key player and saw a sharp uptake in his form for the club and slowly began to win over the fans with whom he had previously had an oft fractious relationship. Xhaka credited Arteta for this resurgence, claiming 'He [Arteta] turned me around and gave me a second chance and he showed me he trusted me and I tried to give him everything back.' On 1 August 2020, Xhaka was selected to start in the FA Cup Final against Chelsea, and went on to win his second winners' medal as Arsenal won their 14th FA Cup.

On 28 August 2020, Xhaka was in the starting 11 in the 2020 FA Community Shield, which Arsenal clinched a 5–4 victory over Liverpool in the penalty shootout after the match was 1–1 after 90 minutes. On 13 December 2020, Arsenal hosted Burnley in a Premier League fixture. Xhaka was sent off at the 56th minute, after clashing with Dwight McNeil and later grabbing Ashley Westwood by the neck. The match eventually ended with Burnley winning 1–0 after teammate Pierre-Emerick Aubameyang scored an own goal at the 73rd minute. On 26 December 2020, he scored his first Premier League goal of the 2020–21 season from a free kick in a 3–1 home win against Chelsea.

On 13 January 2022, Xhaka received a red card in an EFL Cup semi-final first-leg tie against Liverpool. It was his fifth overall red card in his Arsenal career. The match eventually ended goalless. Xhaka scored his first goal of the 2021–22 season with a long-range strike from 25 yards out, that helped seal a 3–1 victory over Manchester United at the Emirates Stadium. His stunning strike was eventually named winner of the club's annual Goal of the Season.

Xhaka scored his first goal of the 2022–23 season, with a third goal from close range against Leicester in a 4–2 victory during their first home game of the season.

International career

2008–2011: Youth levels and senior debut
Xhaka has played for Swiss youth squad at the U-17 level. He participated in the Under-17 World Cup in 2009 in Nigeria. The Swiss team won the World Cup.

He played his first game for the Switzerland national under-19 football team on 25 May 2010, as a substitute, as the team beat Austria national under-19 football team 3–2 in the Schwaz, Austria. He scored his first goal for the U-19 on 7 September 2010 as the team won 3–0 against the Czech Republic.

Xhaka played his first game for the under-21 side on 3 September 2010, as a substitute, as the team beat the Republic of Ireland 1–0 at the Cornaredo Stadium in Lugano. This was the last game in the qualification Group 2 to the 2011 UEFA European Under-21 Championship. Xhaka was member of the Swiss U-21 squad that competed in the final tournament, hosted by Denmark, between 11 and 25 June 2011. The Swiss team reached the final without conceding a goal, but lost to Spain 2–0.

2011–present: Tournaments and captaincy

Before making his international debut for Switzerland, Xhaka was still undecided whether to play for his birth country or Albania, and he complained to the Albanian sports media that FSHF was ignoring him while the Swiss Football Association was showing much more interest.

Xhaka debuted for Switzerland at Wembley Stadium against England in a 2–2 UEFA Euro 2012 qualification draw on 4 June 2011. On 15 November 2011, during his sixth international appearance, he scored his first international goal in the 1–0 away win against Luxembourg at the Stade Josy Barthel.

Switzerland also tried to select Xhaka to participate in the 2012 Olympic Football tournament, but he opted to stay at his new club for pre-season training. He participated in all ten of Switzerland's 2014 FIFA World Cup qualification campaign matches, scoring both goals in a 2–0 defeat of Slovenia. On 2 June 2014, Xhaka was named in Switzerland's 2014 World Cup squad by national coach Ottmar Hitzfeld. In the team's second match, Xhaka scored in a 5–2 loss to France.

Xhaka was selected for Euro 2016, where Switzerland's campaign opened against Albania in Lens. Xhaka, whose team won 1–0, was playing against his brother Taulant. He was voted the man of the match. Xhaka played every minute of Switzerland's campaign, which ended in the round of 16 with a loss to Poland at the Stade Geoffroy-Guichard; after a 1–1 draw he was the only player to not score in the penalty shoot-out, shooting wide.

Ahead of the 2018 World Cup qualifiers, there was speculation that Xhaka could switch his allegiance to represent Kosovo, which had been accepted as a full member of FIFA and were allowed to play competitive matches for the first time. Xhaka, however, published an open letter stating that his participation in Euro 2016 had disqualified him from changing his allegiance, and he was thus tied to Switzerland.

Xhaka was named in manager Vladimir Petković's 23-man Swiss squad for the 2018 FIFA World Cup in Russia. On 22 June, he equalised with a long-range strike as the Swiss came from behind to defeat Serbia 2–1 in their second game. He and fellow goalscorer Xherdan Shaqiri, who is also of Kosovan descent, celebrated their goals by making an eagle gesture resembling the double headed eagle of the Albanian flag. FIFA fined each player 10,000 Swiss francs "for unsporting behaviour contrary to the principles of fair-play".

Xhaka was appointed as a temporary captain by Vladimir Petković in the absence of Stephan Lichtsteiner, which caused him to be criticised by former Swiss international Stéphane Henchoz, who claimed that Xhaka could not properly represent Switzerland due to his Albanian heritage, instead suggesting that Lichtsteiner, Yann Sommer, or Fabian Schär serve as captain. In September 2019, Xhaka offered his captaincy to Xherdan Shaqiri in an effort to get him to return to the national side. 

In June 2021, Xhaka was selected for the Switzerland squad which would compete in Euro 2020. In November 2022, Xhaka was selected for the 26-man Switzerland squad for the 2022 FIFA World Cup in Qatar.

Personal life
In July 2017, Xhaka married his long-term Albanian partner, Leonita Lekaj. They have two daughters, born in 2019 and 2021. Xhaka is Sunni Muslim.

Career statistics

Club

International

Switzerland score listed first, score column indicates score after each Xhaka goal

Honours
Basel
Swiss Super League: 2010–11, 2011–12
Swiss Cup: 2011–12

Arsenal
FA Cup: 2016–17, 2019–20
FA Community Shield: 2017, 2020

Switzerland U17
FIFA U-17 World Cup: 2009

Individual
Swiss Footballer of the Year: 2017, 2022
Swiss Youth Footballer of the Year: 2012

See also
List of men's footballers with 100 or more international caps

References

External links

Profile at the Arsenal F.C. website
Profile at the Swiss Football Association website (in German)

1992 births
Living people
Footballers from Basel
Swiss men's footballers
Association football midfielders
FC Basel players
Borussia Mönchengladbach players
Arsenal F.C. players
Swiss Super League players
Bundesliga players
Premier League players
FA Cup Final players
Switzerland youth international footballers
Switzerland under-21 international footballers
Switzerland international footballers
2014 FIFA World Cup players
UEFA Euro 2016 players
2018 FIFA World Cup players
UEFA Euro 2020 players
2022 FIFA World Cup players
FIFA Century Club
Swiss expatriate footballers
Expatriate footballers in England
Expatriate footballers in Germany
Swiss expatriate sportspeople in England
Swiss expatriate sportspeople in Germany
Swiss people of Albanian descent
Swiss people of Kosovan descent
Swiss Muslims